The Howard Covered Bridge was east of Rockville, Indiana. The single-span Burr Arch covered bridge structure was built by J. A. Britton in 1913 and torn down in 1931 or 1932 during the expansion of U.S. Route 36 (US 36).

History
This bridge replaced the previous Plank Road Covered Bridge. The original bridge was built when the Plank Road between Indianapolis and Montezuma was put in. The planks soon rotted however and the Parke County Commissioners purchased the road, graveled it, and made it a free road. The new bridge was put in when the old bridge was destroyed during the Great Flood of 1913. Britton was able to retain the unique look of the squared off opening and rounded false front that hid the normal peak roof that resembled the earlier Plank Road Covered Bridge, unlike his normal "Britton Portal."

The road that used the bridge would go through would go through a couple of name change over the years. In 1918 the state of Indiana went through and   numbered certain roads as state roads. Then when the U.S. Highway System came into Indiana in 1926, some of the state roads went through another number change. That meant that in 1918 the Plank Road was changed to Indiana State Road 31 (SR 31). When the U.S. Highways were designated in the area, "31" was already in use on the north–south U.S. Route 31 (US 31). So, old SR 31 became new US 36. With the new road though came a straightening out of the old road and with this the bridge was bypassed with the new road going to the north of the bridge.

See also
 Parke County Covered Bridges
 Parke County Covered Bridge Festival

References

Former covered bridges in Parke County, Indiana
Bridges completed in 1913
1913 establishments in Indiana
Wooden bridges in Indiana
Burr Truss bridges in the United States
Road bridges in Indiana